Macau participated at the 2017 Summer Universiade, in Taipei, Taiwan.

Medal summary

Medal by sports

Medalists

Official Sports

References

 Macau Overview

External links
Universiade Taipei 2017

Nations at the 2017 Summer Universiade
2017 in Macau sport